Tritonicula pickensi is a species of dendronotid nudibranch. It is a marine gastropod mollusc in the family Tritoniidae. A number of Caribbean and western Pacific species of Tritonia were moved to a new genus Tritonicula in  2020 as a result of an integrative taxonomic study of the family Tritoniidae.

Distribution
This species was described from the Gulf of California. It was discovered at La Jolla Shores, Southern California in 1998.

References

Tritoniidae
Gastropods described in 1967